King Glacier is a glacier close northwest of Mount Ida, flowing north from the Queen Alexandra Range into the Ross Ice Shelf off Antarctica. It was named by the Advisory Committee on Antarctic Names for Lieutenant Hugh A. King, U.S. Navy, officer in charge at Hallett Station, 1964.

References

Glaciers of the Ross Dependency
Shackleton Coast